Dick Becker is an American gasser drag racer.

Becker drove a Ford-powered 1950 Anglia dubbed The Hammer.

He won one NHRA national title, in G/Gas, at the 1967 Nationals at Indianapolis Raceway Park.

Notes

Sources
Davis, Larry. Gasser Wars, North Branch, MN:  Cartech, 2003, pp. 183–8.</ref>

Dragster drivers
American racing drivers
Year of birth missing